The discography of Japanese musician, LiSA includes 6 studio albums, 2 compilation albums, 3 extended plays, 19 singles, and 5 video albums. LiSA debuted in 2010 as a part of Girls Dead Monster, a musical group featured in the anime Angel Beats!, an anime featuring a high school rock band. LiSA recorded music as the singing voice for the character Yui, and released her first single as a part of the group, "Thousand Enemies", in May 2010 through Key Sounds Label. In June 2010, Girls Dead Monster released Keep the Beats!, an album entirely composed of songs sung by LiSA. The album was commercially successful; certified gold by the Recording Industry Association of Japan.

In April 2011, LiSA made her debut as a soloist with the extended play Letters to U, through the Sony Music Entertainment Japan sub-label Aniplex. Following this with the single "Oath Sign", recorded for the 2011 anime series Fate/Zero, she released her debut album Lover"s"mile in February 2012. "Oath Sign", along with her song "Crossing Field" (2012) and "Rising Hope" (2014) are her most commercially successful singles, all of which have been certified by the Recording Industry Association of Japan.

Much of LiSA's music has been used for theme songs of anime in Japan. Outside of her music for Angel Beats!, LiSA has sung songs for Fate/Zero and Fate/stay night, Sword Art Online, Day Break Illusion, The Irregular at Magic High School, Nisekoi, Demon Slayer: Kimetsu no Yaiba and the Sega fighting game Dengeki Bunko: Fighting Climax.

Albums

Studio albums

Compilation albums

Extended plays

Soundtracks

Singles

As a lead artist

As a featured artist

Promotional singles

Other appearances

Video albums

Music videos

Notes

References 

Discographies of Japanese artists
Pop music discographies